Wang Xiyu was the defending champion having won the previous edition in 2019 but chose not to participate.

Irina Khromacheva won the title, defeating Arantxa Rus in the final, 6–4, 1–6, 7–6(10–8).

Seeds

Draw

Finals

Top half

Bottom half

References

Main Draw

Solgironès Open Catalunya - Singles